St Andrew's First Presbyterian Church is a Neoclassical Presbyterianism church constructed in 1850 in the Auckland city centre, and is the oldest surviving church in Auckland. It is registered as a Category I heritage building by Heritage New Zealand.

History 

In May 1847, a committee was established to find a Presbyterian minister for the city of Auckland, and to construct a suitable church. Construction began on the building in December 1847, but due to problems with cost the construction was slow and scaled back. The main church building was completed in 1850, making St Andrew's the oldest surviving church in Auckland. The church building was constructed from locally sourced basalt and Mahurangi mudstone, from a plan by architect Walter Robertson. Scottish minister David Bruce arrived in 1853, and by 1860 the name St Andrews was adopted. Governor George Grey and his family attended the church, as well as many other influential members of Auckland society.

St Andrew's was seen as the mother church for Presbyterianism in the Auckland Province, and to express this, the church building was expanded in the 1880s, by the addition of a Greek Revival portico and tower, completed in 1882. A portico and tower were features of the original buildings plans, however the additions did not use Robertson's original designs, instead adopted a new design by Matthew Henderson.

The church suffered from falling patronage in the 1920s and 1930s due to the growth and suburbanisation of Auckland, to the point where the church faced closure in the 1930s. In 1957, the church was refurbished.

In the mid-1980s, a service began for the Indonesian community in Auckland. Refurbishment work on the church began in April 2001, which included the removal of the louvres with stained glass.

References 

1850 establishments in New Zealand
1850s architecture in New Zealand
Auckland CBD
Buildings and structures in Auckland
Churches completed in 1850
Greek Revival church buildings
Heritage New Zealand Category 1 historic places in the Auckland Region
Listed churches in New Zealand
Neoclassical church buildings in New Zealand
Presbyterian churches in New Zealand
Stone churches in New Zealand